Leerbroek is a village in the Dutch province of Utrecht.

Leerbroek was a separate municipality between 1817, when it was separated from Meerkerk, and 1986, when it merged with Zederik in the province of South Holland. When Zederik merged into the new municipality Vijfheerenlanden in 2019, it became a part of the province of Utrecht.

History 
The village was first mentioned between 1395 and 1396 as Lederbroec, and means "canal through swampy land". Leerbroek started as a cultivation project in the 12th century. The Dutch Reformed Church dated from the 16th century, but burnt down in 1935. It was rebuilt in 1936. In 1840, it was home to 214 people.

Gallery

References

Former municipalities of South Holland
Populated places in Utrecht (province)
Vijfheerenlanden